Parassy is a commune in the Cher department in the Centre-Val de Loire region of France.

Geography
The grapes grown here are used for Ménétou-Salon AOC wine.

Population

Sights
 A nineteenth-century chateau.
 Holy Trinity church, dating from the twelfth century.

See also
Communes of the Cher department

References

Communes of Cher (department)